Höpfingen, sometimes spelled Hoepfingen, is a municipality in the district of Neckar-Odenwald-Kreis, in Baden-Württemberg, Germany.

Administration
The municipality consists of two subdivisions:
 Höpfingen
 Waldstetten

Geography
The district lies on the southeastern slope of the Odenwald mountain range. Part is included with the Neckartal-Odenwald Nature Park, one of the largest national parks in Baden-Württemberg.

Höpfingen, in the northern part of the municipality, has forests, fields and meadows. To the south, the town of Waldstetten sits in a valley with several streams running through.

References

Neckar-Odenwald-Kreis